Mine Storm (also written as MineStorm) is a multidirectional shooter similar to Atari, Inc.'s 1979 Asteroids arcade game. It was published in 1982 by General Consumer Electronics as the built-in game for the Vectrex system. Mine Storm was implemented by John Hall.

Gameplay
Developed by General Consumer Electronics, Vectrex's manufacturer, it was built into the game system. The gameplay is very similar to that of Atari's Asteroids. The game begins with a large enemy ship dropping mines onto the field as an ominous jingle plays, and moves from the top to the bottom of the screen, where it disappears. The player's ship starts in the middle of the field with 5 lives. Numerous mines then start popping up. The player must destroy all of the mines in order to progress to the next minefield. All of the mines can be destroyed with one shot, or hit with the player's ship, costing the player a life. There are 4 types of mines. The original mines are stationary, then second level has magnetic mines that follow the player's ship if neared, the third has mines that shoot fireballs back when destroyed, and the last are magnetic fireball mines.

The original version that came packaged with the Vectrex system included a bug causing the game to crash on the thirteenth level. Players who called GCE (Milton Bradley in the UK) and reported the bug received a MineStorm II cartridge free of charge in the mail. Only a few people did this, making the game extremely rare.

Reception
MineStorm was reviewed in 1982 by Video in its "Arcade Alley" column, where it was described as "a fast-moving contest, more than slightly similar to Asteroids". David H. Ahl of Creative Computing Video & Arcade Games praised the controls' "excellent" responsiveness, and the "simply magnificent" graphics and sound. He recommended the game to Asteroids fans who were disappointed by other home versions.

Reviews
Games

References

External links
History of Gaming Platforms: The Vectrex

1982 video games
Vectrex games
Video game clones
Video games developed in the United States
Multidirectional shooters